Phyllodoce may refer to:
 Phyllodoce (plant), a genus of plants which includes the mountainheaths or mountain heathers
 Phyllodoce (annelid), a genus of polychaete worms belonging to the family Phyllodocidae,
 Phyllodoce, an invalid name for a genus of hydrozoans, Velella

See also
 Phyllodoce floribunda or Acacia floribunda
 Phyllodoce stricta or Acacia stricta
 Phyllodoce verticillata or  Acacia verticillata